Schizodactylus hesperus is a species of cricket in the Schizodactylidae family, originally described in 1967 by Bey-Bienko.

References

Ensifera
Insects described in 1967